Pickett House may refer to:

James A. Pickett House, Finchville, Kentucky, listed on the National Register of Historic Places in Shelby County, Kentucky
Kernodle-Pickett House, Bellemont, North Carolina, National Register of Historic Places listings in Alamance County, North Carolina
Pickett House (Bellingham, Washington), listed on the NRHP in Washington